Dorset & Wilts 3 North was an English Rugby Union league, forming part of the South West Division, for clubs primarily based in Wiltshire, sitting at tier 10 of the English rugby union system. Promoted teams tended to move up to Dorset & Wilts 2 North and there was no relegation. The league was created in 2005 and was disbanded after the 2019–20 season.

History 
Until 2005, Dorset & Wilts 3 was one division with teams from Berkshire included. In that year, three regional divisions were created for teams in Dorset and Wiltshire, namely Dorset & Wilts 3 North, Dorset & Wilts 3 South and Dorset & Wilts 3 West. The West division was disbanded at the end of the 2008–09 season, leaving just the North and South divisions.

On occasion, clubs in this division also took part in the RFU Junior Vase, a level 9–12 national competition.

The 2019–20 season ended early in view of the COVID-19 pandemic, in common with all English leagues. Neither of the Dorset & Wilts 3 divisions featured in plans for the 2020–21 season.

2019–20

2018–19

2017–18

2016–17
Alfred's Nomads
Bradford-upon-Avon II (relegated from Dorset & Wilts 2 North)
Corsham II
Devizes III
Melksham III
Minety II
Swindon III
Swindon College Old Boys II (relegated from Dorset & Wilts 2 North)
Supermarine II
Trowbridge III
Warminster II
Westbury II

2015–16
The division consisted of eleven teams, all based in Wiltshire.

Eight of the eleven teams participated in last season's competition. The 2014–15 champions, Combe Down II, were promoted to Dorset & Wilts 2 North, while Chippenham III and Supermarine II were relegated from there.  No teams were relegated to Dorset & Wilts 4.

2012–13
Bradford-on-Avon II
Calne II	 	 
Colerne	
Devizes III	
Melksham III 
Minety II
Pewsey Vale II
Supermarine III
Swindon III
Swindon College Old Boys III	 	 
Trowbridge III	 	 
Warminster II

2011–12
Calne II 
Colerne 
Combe Down II 
Devizes III 
Melksham III 
Midsomer Norton IV
Mintey II
Pewsey Vale II 
Supermarine II 
Swindon College Old Boys III 
Trowbridge III 
Warminster II

Original teams
When this division was introduced in 1992 it was a single division known as Berks/Dorset/Wilts 3, containing the following teams from Dorset and Wiltshire:

Amesbury – transferred from Berks/Dorset/Wilts 3 East (4th)
Colerne – transferred from Berks/Dorset/Wilts 3 East (5th)
Plessey Christ – transferred from Berks/Dorset/Wilts 3 West (6th)
Portcastrians – transferred from Berks/Dorset/Wilts 3 West (7th)
Poole – transferred from Berks/Dorset/Wilts 3 West (5th)
Westbury – transferred from Berks/Dorset/Wilts 3 West (4th)

Dorset & Wilts 3 North honours

Berks/Dorset/Wilts 3 (1992–1993)

Originally Dorset & Wilts 3 North and Dorset & Wilts 3 South were combined in a single division known as Berks/Dorset/Wilts 3.  Berks/Dorset/Wilts 3 itself was created ahead of the 1992–93 season by merging the existing Berks/Dorset/Wilts 3 East and Berks/Dorset/Wilts 3 West divisions.  It was a tier 10 league with promotion to Berks/Dorset/Wilts 2 and there was no relegation.

Berks/Dorset/Wilts 3 (1993–1996)

The creation of National League 5 South for the 1993–94 season meant that Berks/Dorset/Wilts 3 dropped to become a tier 11 league.  Promotion continued to  Berks/Dorset/Wilts 2 and there was no relegation.

Berks/Dorset/Wilts 3 (1996–2000)

The cancellation of National League 5 South at the end of the 1995–96 season meant that Berks/Dorset/Wilts 3 reverted to being a tier 10 league.  Promotion continued to Berks/Dorset/Wilts 2 and there was no relegation.  At the end of the 1999–00 season the division was cancelled and all teams transferred into the new look Dorset & Wilts 2 North or Dorset & Wilts 2 South

Dorset & Wilts 3 North (2005–2009)

After an absence of four years, Berks/Dorset/Wilts 3 was reintroduced in the form of two tier 10 regional divisions – Dorset & Wilts 3 North and Dorset & Wilts 3 South.  Promotion was to Dorset & Wilts 2 North and there was no relegation.

Dorset & Wilts 3 North (2009–present)

Despite widespread restructuring by the RFU at the end of the 2008–09 season, Dorset & Wilts 3 North remained a tier 10 league, with promotion continuing to Dorset & Wilts 2 North and there was no relegation.

Number of league titles

Combe Down II (2)
Swindon College Old Boys II (2)
Amesbury (1)
Bath Saracens (1)
Berkshire Shire Hall (1)
Bradford-on-Avon (1)
Calne II (1)
Colerne (1)
Corsham II (1)
Corsham III (1)
Dorset Police (1)
Fairford (1)
Hungerford (1)
Minety (1)
Minety II (1)
Poole (1)
Puddletown (1)
Portcastrians (1)
Royal Wootton Bassett III (1)
Trowbridge III (1)

Notes

See also 
 South West Division RFU
 Dorset & Wilts RFU
 English rugby union system
 Rugby union in England

References

Defunct rugby union leagues in England
Rugby union in Dorset
Rugby union in Wiltshire